
Myszków County is a unit of territorial administration and local government (powiat) in Silesian Voivodeship, southern Poland. It came into being on January 1, 1999, as a result of the Polish local government reforms passed in 1998.

As of 2019 its total population is 70,959, out of which the population of Myszków is 31,650, that of Żarki is 4,556, that of Koziegłowy is 2,455, and the rural population is 32,298.

Neighbouring counties
Myszków County is bordered by Częstochowa County to the north, Zawiercie County to the south-east, Będzin County to the south, and Tarnowskie Góry County and Lubliniec County to the west.

Administrative division
The county is subdivided into five gminas (one urban, two urban-rural and two rural). These are listed in the following table, in descending order of population.

References

 
Land counties of Silesian Voivodeship